The Bai Kei Viti (BKV, sometimes known in English as Protector of Fiji, or Fortress for the People of Fiji), was a political party in Fiji.

The party was formed by residents and some chiefs of Ba Province to contest the 1999 elections, but failed to win any seats in the House of Representatives.  Following the coup d'état which deposed the elected government of Prime Minister Mahendra Chaudhry in 2000, the BKV contested the election held to restore democracy in 2001.  This time, they had former interim Prime Minister Ratu Tevita Momoedonu (a defector from the Fiji Labour Party) as their leader, but once again, they won no seats, though they received 2.2 percent of the popular vote.

In 2004 the BKV merged with the Party of National Unity (PANU), also a Ba-based party, to form the People's National Party (PNP) under the leadership of former Cabinet Minister Meli Bogileka, and was officially deregistered on 14 August 2005.  Bogileka declared that officials from the two parties wanted Ba Province to have a single party to represent their interests at the parliamentary election scheduled for 2006.

The merger proved complicated, however.  PANU spokesman Senator Ponipate Lesavua announced on 11 January 2006 that he had reregistered the defunct party, and on 23 January that the BKV had also seceded from the PNP and had signed an agreement to merge with PANU.  On 5 March, the BKV, PANU, and the PNP all decided to resume the merger, but this time under the PANU banner.

Defunct political parties in Fiji
Political parties established in 1999
Political parties disestablished in 2005